SpongeBob SquarePants: Legend of the Lost Spatula is a 2001 platform action video game developed by Vicarious Visions and published by THQ for the Game Boy Color handheld game console. It is the first video game to be based on SpongeBob SquarePants. The game's story centers on SpongeBob SquarePants, a sea sponge who lives in the undersea town of Bikini Bottom and works for Mr. Krabs as the fry cook of the Krusty Krab fast food restaurant. SpongeBob is destined to become the ocean's greatest fry cook, and must embark on a quest to retrieve a golden spatula from the Flying Dutchman, a pirate ghost. The game features platforming-style gameplay, as well as many characters from the television series.

Gameplay

As SpongeBob, the player embarks on an undersea quest to find the Flying Dutchman's Golden Spatula in order to become the ocean's greatest short-order cook. If SpongeBob gets hit, his clothing falls off. If SpongeBob is wearing a jacket power-up, he loses it when he is hit. If he takes a hit with no jacket, his pants fall off, leaving him to run around in his underwear. If his underwear falls off, he loses a life.  Along the way, SpongeBob meets and interacts with many of the show's popular recurring characters like Mr. Krabs, Squidward Tentacles, Sandy Cheeks, and Patrick Star. The game uses elements of adventure and side-scrolling gameplay.

Reception

The game has received mixed reviews. Frank Provo of GameSpot said "One could argue that SpongeBob SquarePants: Legend of the Lost Spatula is geared toward the younger audience of the TV series, which would explain the game's simplified gameplay and lack of variety. However, while the plot is endearing and the characters will no doubt appeal to the series' fans, there is no evidence to suggest that children would actually enjoy playing a game this unremarkable--let alone adults." Provo criticized the game for its "simplified gameplay" and "lack of variety," but gave praise to the graphics, saying the game "at least looks decent". Jon Griffith of IGN complimented the game as a "decent platformer" with "large levels, multiple objectives, and amusing characters" but criticized it for its password saving system, confusing level design, and difficulty in certain aspects of gameplay.

References

External links
 Information page at IGN
 Information page at GameSpot
 

2001 video games
Engine Software games
Game Boy Color games
Game Boy Color-only games
Side-scrolling video games
Single-player video games
Legend of the Lost Spatula
THQ games
Vicarious Visions games
Video games developed in the United States